Pupil are a Filipino rock band consisting of singer and rhythm guitarist Ely Buendia, lead guitarist Jerome Velasco, bassist Dok Sergio and drummer Wendell Garcia.

History

Early years and formation (2004–2005)
Pupil was formed when former Teeth bassist Dok Sergio joined The Mongols' line-up in late 2004. The Mongols' bassist Yan "Yanni" Yuzon moved to third guitar duties while Sergio handled bass. The transitional five-man line-up was witnessed in The Mongols’ last single and music video entitled “Heroine”. In May 2005, guitarist Jerome Velasco, a.k.a. J. Astro, left to pursue a career in producing, recording and studio engineering. The group's last gig under the name "The Mongols" was on July 7, 2005.

Velasco’s departure shook things up for the group as they were trapped into the decision of whether to stay as a band or not. As they decided to continue and as they progressed, the band noticed that they were producing a different sound without Velasco on the lead guitar and decided to form a "new" band. “We got a better bass player and dumber guitarist,” jokes guitarist Yan Yuzon, who left bass playing duties to Dok Sergio to take Velasco’s place. Upon the determination of forming a “new” band, the group’s first move was to change their name.

Frontman Ely Buendia chanced upon the name "Pupil" while browsing a medical book. The band wanted a classic name for a rock band. Before using Pupil, they tried several other names, such as Villain, Lords of Nasdaq, The Gets, Trochlean, Traitors, and Tyrel Corp. They chose the name Pupil because Buendia liked the fact that it is the part of the eye where light enters. Guitarist Yan Yuzon likes its double meaning, as well as the “eternal learning” connotations of the name. Pupil's launch gig was on July 13, 2005, at the UP Bahay ng Alumni. Pupil also joined Livestock Productions. It was an event group with members such as Sponge Cola, Kiko Machine, Menaya, Tawo, Sleepyheads, and Elytistas.

Resurgence
Pupil had a hard time searching for a record label. They submitted their demo to several labels, but no one was more enthusiastic about the new material than the newly merged Sony BMG. Incidentally, Ely left BMG Pilipinas in 2002 in the wake of his falling out with the Eraserheads. However, BMG accepted Buendia again like a "prodigal son" as he himself describes it in their debut album's insert.

The band admits that there is a distinct challenge for them, coming out of their past bands (Eraserheads and The Teeth). The challenge is particularly pronounced on frontman, Ely Buendia, since older fans tend to compare him and his new band with the huge popularity of The Eraserheads before. In an interview by Y. Losorata he says, "I just want my fans and hopefully, my fans to be, to appreciate my music. I’m lucky to still have my career in music as a job and as part of Pupil wala akong (I don't have) delusions to become as big as my previous band was." In fact, the band itself describes their music as actually "one foot in the past, one foot in the present and both eyes dead set at the future." According to Buendia, it's not being there but getting there that's exciting for him, no matter how many times he tries to get there. He later added in a different interview, "Let’s just say that the Eraserheads is about escaping reality and Pupil is about accepting reality."

Reception and success
Local radio stations' initial reception of Pupil's music, though, was relatively limited (with the exception of NU 107) due to the band's genre and musical style. While the band's carrier single, "Nasaan Ka?" was played often and achieved quite a popularity among listeners, other singles released from their album encountered more hurdles. The song "Nasaan Ka?" was used as main theme and "story" (based on lyrics) for the first episode of the second season of Your Song. Frontman Ely Buendia says, "Some pop radio stations are still making up their minds on 'Dianetic' which I personally don’t understand since it’s really just one of those straightforward love songs medyo on the noisy side nga lang (just a little bit on the noisy side)." "Then again, minsan talaga hindi mo maintindihan ang ibang radio stations (sometimes you cannot understand some radio stations). It’s not as if they don’t play songs by foreign artists like Nirvana with music heavier on distorted electric guitar than ours. Pero okay lang (But that's okay), that’s the reality of things." He speculates that xenocentrism has something to do about the double standard these radio stations go by. Consequently, they were forced to release an acoustic version of their second single, "Dianetic". The acoustic version of "Nasaan Ka?" was then used as a Bonus Track for Sony BMG's CD Sampler 2006 Volume 3.

However, the band had relatively early success as evidenced by advertising projects that they were involved with and local awards that they have won. They were featured as the Rising Star for the month of May 2006 in MTV Philippines. In the 19th Awit Awards held in Casino Filipino, they won the Award for Best Performance By A New Group Recording Artist/s category. They received another award for their first single, "Nasaan Ka?" at the MTV Pilipinas VMA 2006, winning the Best Rock Video Award. Then, Wrigley's Juicy Fruit chose them as their promotional models for their product along with Barbie Almalbis, another local artist. They also received endorsement deals from Levi's, Puma, Ray-Ban and Pony footwear.

On November 26, 2006, Pupil won the SOP Music Awards 2006 Breakthrough Recording Artist of The Year Award. "We don't think Pupil should've qualified as 'breakthrough artist' because this actually is our second album after we changed our name from The Mongols", says Ely.

The band also participated in the 2006 MTV Staying Alive Music Summit for HIV/AIDS. Pupil’s fourth single, "Gamu-Gamo", quickly climbed NU 107’s Stairway to Seven's number one spot within the first week of 2007. The band also performed a special 8-minute medley (which included a cover of the Eraserheads hit, "Pare Ko") at the 2nd MYX Music Awards which was held on March 15, 2007, at the AFP Theater, Camp Aguinaldo.

The arrival and departure of Wendell Garcia and new albums (2007–present)
On July 25, 2007, Yan Yuzon announced in Pupil's mailing list that Bogs Jugo, the band's drummer, left the band to pursue other things for his career. Wendell Garcia, formerly of Barbie's Cradle, replaced Jugo. Garcia played his first gig as the new drummer on July 26, 2007, at the Hard Rock Cafe, Makati. The gig also featured new songs from Pupil's second album. The Mongols' Jerome Velasco played synths with the band. He is also the band's producer for their second album.

Since the release of the band’s second album (Wild Life), the band has enjoyed greater mainstream success and better album sales. The band has also toured and performed in other countries such as Singapore, Qatar, Dubai, Canada and United States. Their live performance of "Disconnection Notice" for MTV Philippines was featured in Best of MTV Live 2008. The same year, the band won 7 different awards which include a Promax/BDA and NU107 Artist of The Year.

Pupil was personally chosen by Nine Inch Nails frontman Trent Reznor as front act in the Manila part of the "Nine Inch Nails: Wave Goodbye" tour, which was held at the Araneta Coliseum on August 5, 2009. The band Nine Inch Nails toured the globe for one last time before going on hiatus indefinitely, as 2009 marked the 20th anniversary of their first release.

This was followed by a film soundtrack, when the band composed and recorded "Ang Panday" for Ang Panday (2009 film). The band released their first book, entitled "Against The Light: A Pupil Tour Diary", it details their recent Summer Tour in the Philippines. It was launched on November 4, 2009, at the Bonifacio High Street. Aside from the guest band Turbo Goth, Lally Buendia (Ely's sister) also guested and performed three songs from her band, Domino. Dok Sergio played bass, Lally on vocals, Ely played keyboard/synths and Paolo Manuel on drums. They joined The Earth Day Concert at the SM Mall of Asia on April 16, 2010, and afterwards, opened for Tears for Fears with Sandwich on May 2, 2010, at the Araneta Coliseum. The band also performed with Amanda Ling as guest artist (formerly of Electrico) on keyboards during the Nine Inch Nails and Tears for Fears events. During the Tears for Fears event, Buendia fronted for Sandwich, with Raimund Marasigan on drums, and performed the classic Eraserheads song "Alapaap".

In 2009, the band announced they will release a compilation of various remixes of the song "Disconnection Notice". It is headed by prominent Filipino DJs, Jerome Velasco, Pat Tirano and Wendell Garcia. The band also contributed to Francis Magalona's posthumous album, In Love and War. After the release of "Limiters of the Infinity Pool" in 2011, it was followed by a United States tour, which included performances in Wilshire Ebell Theater, Ebell of Los Angeles and Slim's, San Francisco.

After Sony Music Philippines' sudden disbandment last March 2012, Pupil transferred to MCA Philippines.

Members

Dok Sergio
Born on February 27, 1976, Bassist Andrew Ryan Steve Ricafranca Sergio is the brother of Rivermaya's former bassist Japs Sergio. Dok and Japs are also members of Daydream Cycle, doing bass and rhythm respectively.

Dok Sergio wrote the lyrics of "Dulo ng Dila" on the spot during recording. It is also the band's first song to hit no. 1 in NU 107's Stairway to Seven chart. In addition, Dok wrote the lyrics of "Shooting Star" by The Teeth, which won the "Song of the Year" award at the NU 107 Rock Awards 2000.

He also runs a silkscreen printing business whose clients include some of the most prominent bands in the local Filipino rock scene today. Aside from The Teeth, one of Dok Sergio's former bands was Warehouse Club where he played guitars and lead vocals, his bandmates were from the members of the band The Youth (Robert Javier and Joseph Carrasgo) and Jun Dela Rosa. During his early days as a musician, he played for bands such as Purple Playground, God's Era and Prominence of Cathedrals.

Dok played bass for Imago and now for indie-band Prank Sinatra. He sometimes jams with Sandwich and played bass for them during the Myx Mo 2008. He uses a Squier Jazz Bass and Fender Japan Jazz Bass Guitar, and recently, a 6-string Fender Bass. Today, aside from having reunited with The Teeth, he also sometimes plays bass for Imago, where he also used to play bass with before.

Ely Buendia

Born on November 2, 1970, Eleandre Basiño Buendía is the band's frontman and guitarist.

Jerome Velasco
Velasco was a pioneer member of The Teeth, The Mongols and Daydream Cycle. He was known as "J. Astro the boy who fell on earth" while he was the lead guitarist of The Mongols. His other bands were Aspirin and Candyaudioline, and he plays ambient guitars and keyboards for The Slave Drum.

In the 2004 NU Rock Awards, Velasco won Guitarist of the Year award, for the Mongols' Buddha's Pest. Although he left The Mongols in 2005, he later returned as a collaborator, composer, producer and guest artist (during live performances) for the band. His latest works with Pupil include Beautiful Machines and Wild Life. Velasco later rejoined the band as guitarist.

Wendell Garcia
Born on May 27, 1976, Wendell Ray C. Garcia, formerly of Barbie's Cradle and Triaxis, is Pupil's drummer, who replaced Bogs Jugo in 2007. He was first featured in Pupil's second album. Garcia also played drums for Sponge Cola as sessionist and as drummer for 6cyclemind's Panorama album, he also co-produced the album with Buddy Zabala, Ebe Dancel, and Francis Magalona.

Garcia also composed the song "012" with Barbie Almalbis and Kakoi Legaspi for "Parade" album. He also plays drums for the Jazz group named "Balooze". When Francis M and Ely Buendia recorded the song "Superproxy 2k6" for Ultraelectromagneticjam Eraserheads tribute, Wendell was responsible for the drum parts and played drums during the recording phase for Francis M's band, Hardware Syndrome. Garcia was the drummer for Juan Dela Cruz Band during their reunion concert.

Wendell also sings while playing drums, his recent performance was a cover of Lauren Wood's "Fallen" from Pretty Woman OST. He also shared his drumming skills for Rico Blanco's Your Universe album and he also plays for Archipelago and sessioned for Nikki Gil during her Myx Live performance. Garcia started playing drums at the age of nine and has won multiple awards ever since.

Wendell Garcia is also a product of Malate Catholic School where singer Kuh Ledesma also attended and graduated.

Garcia left the band in 2016 and migrated to United States but later returned to the Philippines and re-joined the band in 2018.

Former members

Yan Yuzon

Born on March 7, 1978, lead guitarist Yan "Yanni" Yrastorza Yuzon is the older brother of Sponge Cola guitarist and frontman, Yael Yuzon. The Yuzons are of Filipino and Basque descent. He also taught theater direction at the Ateneo de Manila University. His famous works include a pop-culture adaptation of Bertolt Brecht’s "Three Penny Opera", "Linya", "Santuario" and a few more.  Yan is also a band member of Archipelago which he's also a lead singer of his band.

Being a very busy man, Yan is also a writer for ABS-CBN’s TV show "Goin' Bulilit". He also played the short role of Liam in ABS-CBN’s "Kay Tagal Kang Hinintay". His acting performances also include the role of Romeo in the Metropolitan Theater Guild's production of Romeo and Juliet (which was used in Sponge Cola's "Gemini" music video), alongside Ina Feleo, daughter of Filipino actor, Johnny Delgado, with the role of Juliet. Yan has previously appeared in local renditions of other Shakespearean plays like "Merchant of Venice" and "Macbeth". He also starred in an indie film titled "Three Boys" for Cinemanila. The film is about a band which is composed of Marc Abaya (vocals and guitars), Ping Medina (bass) and Yan Yuzon (drums). It was directed by Ming Kai Leung and produced by Marie Jamora.

Yan also used to front for the indie neo-glam band called Cat Siamese. Yan uses a Gibson Robot Guitar, Carvin classic white guitar, Fender Stratocaster and Epiphone Les Paul. Yan Yuzon also launched his new band called Archipelago. Its members are Wendell Garcia on drums, Chad Rialp (of Sound and Liquid Jane) on bass, Pat Tirano (of Toi and Monkeyspank, co-produced Beautiful Machines and also co-produced Sponge Cola's Transit and self-titled third album with Yan Yuzon) on lead guitars and Yan Yuzon himself on frontman duties.

He was also featured in an instrumental compilation called "Mga Gitarista" (The Guitarists), wherein it features various instrumental songs from Filipino guitarists from different OPM bands such as Barbie Almalbis, Francis Reyes, Mong Alcaraz and Mike Elgar. His song "Mount Ordeals" was inspired by Final Fantasy Series.

Bogs Jugo

Born on February 17, 1979, Drummer Ricardo Nicholas Bañaga Jugo is also the synth and beat programmer for the dream pop/electronica group Daydream Cycle, where he also recorded, produced and mastered the band's first album. Bogs is into video games, he once worked as an online customer assistance representative for an international videogame console company.

Playing “Hypersober” live was a different set-up for the band. Yan played the drums. Dok gets to play the guitars. Ely did the bass, and of course, Bogs on vocals. Bogs also used "d lite" and "Boga Man" as a nickname during the early days of The Mongols. He was also a member of the band Water No-nos, with Japs Sergio, and has played with other bands as guitarist and drummer.

On July 25, 2007, Yan Yuzon announced in Pupil's mailing list that Bogs Jugo left the band to pursue other things for his career. However, Yuzon said that Jugo had already expressed his desire to quit his duties for both of his bands, Pupil and Daydream Cycle, as early as the summer of 2007. Bogs, a pioneer member of the group since The Mongols, ensured smooth transition for Pupil into its current new lineup. He was replaced by Wendell Garcia, formerly of Barbie's Cradle.

Contrary to speculations, he did not leave the music industry at all. Jugo is still a musician, but more within the indie and underground scene; perhaps to give way to his other activities and new career. After he left Pupil and DDC, he also sessioned with Nina’s live band as drummer and also for Tawo band. Currently he is the drummer for Us-2 Evil-0, and he also played guitars for She Hates Ballet. Jugo recently joined Hit Productions as an Audio Engineer, a company that's also co-headed by Mike Villegas, formerly of Rizal Underground.

Other personnel

Patrick Tirano

Patrick Tirano worked with the band as co-producer of Beautiful Machines and he also mastered Wild Life album. Tirano is in charge of helping the band create unique sounds. According to pupil.ph, "aside from being the band's main sound forger, he also takes time and documents Pupil's life on video." He's also a member of Archipelago, TOI, Monkeyspank and Rugis.

Dr. Day Cabuhat
Dr. Day Cabuhat once managed The Eraserheads and now co-manages Pupil with Diane Ventura. She first wrote "Sumasabay" as a literary piece which was later translated by Dok Sergio into a song.

Diane Ventura

Aside from being a manager, she has co-written a number of the band's songs and has shared her singing voice as both lead and backing vocals.

Discography

Beautiful Machines

Beautiful Machines, Pupil's debut album, was released on November 10, 2005, under Sony BMG, the same music company that publishes The Eraserheads' music. The band itself describes their music as "dark, loud, and romantic." Yan Yuzon describes their genre as "everyrock" meaning an amorphous mass of rock and roll, classic and stadium rock, punk, new wave, glam rock, goth rock, heavy metal, grunge, and everything in between. It is very guitar-driven, stripped down, and the album has a very distinct sound, considering that it is the band's debut album. The album was recorded digitally at Wombworks in Marikina, the studio founded by Louie Talan of Razorback. “We didn’t use amps at all,” Buendia says. The album was mastered at Tweak Merville by Zach Lucero, drummer of the band, Imago.

Hoodwinked Soundtrack
One of the band's songs entitled "Blow Your House Down" was featured in a Hollywood CGI animated film Hoodwinked, from The Weinstein Company. An instrumental version of the song was played in the background of the Granny Xtreme skiing scene. The film's soundtrack was released under Rykodisc. Most animations and visuals of Hoodwinked were created and processed at Digital Eye Candy, Makati. One of the head animators behind the Hoodwinked team, Gorio Vicuna, is the one who designed and directed the album cover and sleeve layout of "Beautiful Machines” album. A line in the lyrics of the song says “no one told you I was abroad”, which in turn, the song was actually used in an international movie.

Rockoustic Mania

Pupil and Barbie Almalbis were chosen by Juicy Fruit as their advertising models to reach out to the younger generation in their Rockoustic Mania advertising events. The promotion included Juicy Fruit's Tugtog Mo! band competition, and Style mo! competition by Human and Pony footwear. The collaboration between the two artists offers a fusion of Rock and Acoustic. The AVCD features two songs, the music videos and some behind the scenes look at the artists' works. It was released on August 24, 2006, under Sony BMG and Warner Music.

The Juicy Fruit Rockoustic Mania Final Fusion event was held on November 17, at the Tanghalang Francisco Balagtas (Folk Arts Theater), Cultural Center of the Philippines. The show featured performances from Barbie Almalbis and Pupil, guest bands Sugarfree and Up Dharma Down, and of course, from the three finalists, WTC 11, Medea, and 7th Skool. The band 7th Skool won the Tugtog Mo! Band Competition.

Audio:
1. Nakakabaliw (E. Buendia, D. Ventura)
2. Must Have (E. Buendia, B. Almalbis, D. Sergio)

Video:
1. Nakakabaliw (Directed by RA Rivera)
2. Must Have (Directed by Pancho Esguerra)
3. MYX News Nakakabaliw by Barbie and Pupil (Behind the scenes)

During the Rockoustic Mania Press Launch at Phi Bar Metrowalk held on June 14, 2006, Barbie Almalbis and Pupil played their songs separately as they showed the crowd their own music styles and genre. They also jammed together and as a bonus, Barbie sang the Eraserheads classic “Overdrive” and on the other hand, “Alapaap” was performed by Pupil.

Animax
Pupil also made a new theme song for Animax Asia, entitled "Set Me Apart". The song had its exclusive Philippine-radio launch by NU107. The song also gained no. 1 spot in NU 107's Stairway to Seven chart within just two weeks after the radio launch and the band was a prominent guest in Mad Mad Fun.

Pupil had been part of Animax Fashion-Ability event, where they made special appearance at the event, played their music, and talked about their fashion style. The band's first onstage public appearance after Ely’s recovery was also with Animax. It was on Saturday, February 10, 2007, when the band performed at The Music Hall in SM Mall of Asia, in an Animax speed-dating and welcome celebration for Valentine’s Day event called “Love Is In The Air”. The band was also featured (along with Sponge Cola and Urbandub) in a show called MUSIC STATION, which also airs on Animax.

The song had its official local launch Tuesday, May 22, 2007, in an exclusive Animax Party at the Hard Rock Cafe Makati, wherein 50 pairs of tickets were given away in a contest. The band had their first overseas gig on May 27 at the Bar None bar in Marriott Hotel, Orchard Road, Singapore. The Singaporean-act The Great Spy Experiment opened for that night's "Bar None Rock Affair" gig. An interview with the band was aired on Friday, June 1, 2007, and Pupil was interviewed on Animax's "Music Talk" by Francis "Brew" Reyes of The Dawn. The Asia-wide launching of the music video of "Set Me Apart" was aired on June 8, 2007, at exactly 7pm on Animax. The music video features the band as "live" anime-styled characters, like cosplayers.

The production of the music video is a first of its kind for a Filipino band, most scenes and characters were done using traditional hand-drawn 2D animation subsequently softly blended with 3D and CGI. One of the famous anime films that used this technique is Ghost in the Shell 2: Innocence, which is also a personal favourite of Ely (as evident with The Mongols' "Case Logic" lyrics and interviews). It was filmed in the Philippines, processed in Malaysia by Hue Visualab, and launched in Animax's ASEAN headquarters in Singapore.

The song won a Promax/BDA award in 2008, making Pupil the first Filipino band to win such award.

Wild Life

Wild Life, their second album under Sony BMG, features 12 tracks. It featured photography work by Francis Magalona. All 11 new tracks features Wendell Garcia as the band's new drummer, while the 12th track, "Set Me Apart", featured Bogs Jugo as the drummer, as his last song with Pupil. The album was recorded in Soundsrite studio in Kalayaan Ave., Makati City. Where its owned and operated by Boyet Aquino, the original drummer of Francis Magalona's band called Hardware Syndrome where Wendell Garcia used to play drums with. The special edition was released on July 10, 2009.

Limiters of the Infinity Pool

In an interview with the Philippine Star Buendia also stated “This time, we were given credit and now we can probably concentrate on making music that matters to us. We just wanna make, if possible, a better album, better than the two — yun yung target ko (that's my target).” The band's third album contains 12 tracks and had the working title "No. 3" as revealed by Buendia.

Amanda Ling and Francis "Brew" Reyes are also part of the album. It is co-produced, recorded, mixed and mastered by Pat Tirano at Wombworks, the band describes their new album "The sound is bigger, more experimental than the first two albums. There's a live string section", with influences from Wall of Sound, Michael Jackson and many others. The third album is officially called "Limiters of the Infinity Pool", released on January 11, 2011, at Robot Bar, Makati. The album features the songs "Let Her Rip", "Distortion", "TNT", "20-20", "Pikit Bukas", "Pusakal", "Pampalakas", "One Two", "Obese", "Deft Mechanic", "Morning Gift" and "The Low End". According to Buendia, aside from being downloadable on iTunes and Amazon.com, the band will also be releasing a Vinyl version of the album.

Zilch

The band confirmed to a group of journalists that their next studio album is set for a January 2015 release. The album's first single, Out of Control, is released on early August 2014.

Studio albums
Beautiful Machines – 2005 
Wildlife – 2007 
Limiters Of The Infinity Pool – 2011
Zilch – 2015

Awards and nominations

References

External links
Pupil Yahoo! Groups
Pupil PinoyBanda Profile
LivELY: Coming Together for Ely Buendia

Filipino rock music groups
MCA Music Inc. (Philippines) artists
Musical groups from Manila
Musical groups established in 2005